Maid in the Heaven is a Philippine television drama-comedy series on ABS-CBN aired from July 5 to November 19, 2004.

Cast
 Cherry Pie Picache as Encar
 Mickey Ferriols as Amy
 Manilyn Reynes as Filomena
 Pokwang as Harlene
 Katrina Gonzales as Betty
 Kristine Gonzales as Boo
 Aleck Bovick as Delia
 Assunta De Rossi as Sharon
 Trina Legazpi as Gwendolyn

References

External links
 

2004 Philippine television series debuts
2004 Philippine television series endings
ABS-CBN drama series
Filipino-language television shows
Television shows set in the Philippines